People known as Margaret of Sicily:

 Margaret of Navarre (1135–1183), wife of William I of Sicily
 Margaret of Sicily (1241–1270), daughter of Frederick II, King of Sicily
 Margaret of Burgundy, Queen of Sicily, (1250–1308), wife of Charles of Anjou, King of Sicily
 Margaret of Sicily, Countess Palatine of the Rhine (1331–1377), daughter of the King Frederick III of Sicily